Shirra Kenworthy (born April 19, 1943) is a Canadian former figure skater who competed in ladies' singles.  She won the silver medal at the Canadian Figure Skating Championships in 1960 and 1961 and captured the bronze the next three years.  She also competed at the World Figure Skating Championships several times, with a best finish of 10th in 1964, and participated in the 1964 Winter Olympic Games, finishing 12th.

Results

References
 Sports-Reference.com

1943 births
Canadian female single skaters
Figure skaters at the 1964 Winter Olympics
Olympic figure skaters of Canada
Living people